Frank Edward Dennie (March 30, 1885 – January 13, 1952) was an American football player, coach, and college athletics administrator.  He played college football at Brown University from 1905 to 1908 and was selected as an end on the 1908 College Football All-America Team.  Dennie served two stints the head football coach at the Missouri School of Mines and Metallurgy—now known as the Missouri University of Science and Technology—in Rolla, Missouri, from 1909 to 1911 and from 1915 to 1917, and one stint at Saint Louis University, from 1912 to 1914.

Dennie was on March 30, 1885, in Concord, Massachusetts.  He attended public schools in Brockton, Massachusetts, and Williston Seminary—now known as Williston Northampton School—in Easthampton, Massachusetts.  Dennie served as the athletic director as Missouri Mines until 1928, when he was appointed assistant professor of mathematics at the school.  He died on January 13, 1952, in Rolla.

Head coaching record

References

External links
 

1885 births
1971 deaths
American football ends
Brown Bears football players
Missouri S&T Miners athletic directors
Missouri S&T Miners football coaches
Missouri University of Science and Technology faculty
Saint Louis Billikens football coaches
Sportspeople from Brockton, Massachusetts
People from Concord, Massachusetts
Players of American football from Massachusetts
Saint Louis University faculty
Saint Louis University mathematicians
Sportspeople from Middlesex County, Massachusetts